Zorić is a Serbo-Croatian surname, derived from Zora ("dawn"). It may refer to:

Dragan Zorić (born 1979), Serbian sprint canoeist
Marko Zorić (born 1980), Serbian footballer
Nataša Zorić (born 1989), professional Serbian tennis player
Nikola Zorić, Serbian musician best known as the keyboardist for the rock band Riblja Čorba

See also
Zoran
Zorica

Matronymic surnames
Serbian surnames
Croatian surnames